Arrival and Departure (1943) is the third novel of Arthur Koestler's trilogy concerning the conflict between morality and expedience (as described in the postscript to the novel's 1966 Danube Edition).  The first volume, The Gladiators, is about the subversion of the Spartacus revolt, and the second, Darkness at Noon, is the celebrated novel about the Soviet Show trials.  Arrival and Departure was Koestler's first full-length work in English, The Gladiators and Darkness at Noon having  originally been written in German. It is often considered to be the weakest of the three. Reviewing the novel in December 1943 George Orwell  called it notable "for what must be one of the most shocking descriptions of Nazi terrorism that have ever been written."

Plot
Written during the middle of World War II, Arrival and Departure reflects Koestler's own plight as a Hungarian refugee. Like Koestler, the main character is a former member of the Communist party. He escapes to "Neutralia," a neutral country based on Portugal, where Koestler himself had gone, and flees from there. (Harold Rosenberg wrote in a book review in Partisan Review that "there ought to be a law against such place-names.") Reflecting Koestler's later life relationship with science, and particularly his disagreement with various movements within psychiatry, the main character emerges from treatment psychically neutered, and the critical question of the novel is how much of his later trauma and political activity is due to a small incident in his childhood.

References

1943 British novels
Novels by Arthur Koestler
Jonathan Cape books